Nafiu is a surname. Notable people with the surname include:

 Abdul Nafiu Idrissu (born 1991), Ghanaian footballer
 Awudu Nafiu (born 1988), Ghanaian footballer
 Nafiu Osagie (1933–2019), Nigerian athlete
 Valmir Nafiu (born 1994), Macedonian footballer of Albanian descent